Saltibum is the first season of the Brazilian version of Celebrity Splash!. The season premiered on April 5, 2014 and run for 9 weeks, ending on May 31, 2014 on Rede Globo.

Actor Rômulo Neto won the competition over actress Camilla Camargo by a difference of 1.0 point.

Format
Twelve Brazilian celebrities were equally divided into two teams led by captains Caio Castro (Red team) and Felipe Titto (Blue team).

The captains are ineligible to win the main prize (a new Volkswagen Up) and are instead competing in weekly dive-offs to win their own car, which would be awarded to the captain who have the highest amount of scores combined over the course of 9 weeks.

Captains dive-off

Contestants

Scoring chart

Average chart

Show details

Week 1
 Celebrity Guest Judge: Humberto Martins
Running order

Week 2
 Celebrity Guest Judge: Emanuelle Araújo
Running order

Week 3
 Celebrity Guest Judge: Nelson Freitas
Running order

Week 4
 Celebrity Guest Judge: Geovanna Tominaga
Running order

Week 5
 Celebrity Guest Judge: Ana Furtado
Running order

Week 6
 Celebrity Guest Judge: Paulo Vilhena
Running order

Week 7
 Celebrity Guest Judge: Tande
Running order

Week 8
 Celebrity Guest Judge: Glenda Kozlowski
Running order

Final
 Celebrity Guest Judge: Cláudia Raia
Running order

References

External links
 Saltibum on GShow.com

2014 Brazilian television seasons
2014 Brazilian television series debuts
Celebrity reality television series